Cordovero is one of fifteen parishes in Pravia, a municipality within the province and autonomous community of Asturias, in northern Spain.

The population is 102 (INE 2007).

Villages and hamlets
 Cordovero (Cordoveiru)
 La Castañal
 Las Piñera
 Villamondrid (Villamundriz)

References

Parishes in Pravia